Elijah McKenzie-Jackson (born 28 December 2003) is a civic artist and climate justice activist, based in London and New York City, known for speaking regarding animal liberation and indigenous rights. McKenzie-Jackson is co-founder at Waic Up, an organizer of Youth Strike for Climate, Extinction Rebellion Youth, and is a United Nations Togetherband Ambassador. He is one of the organizers of Fridays for Future UK; starting in February 2019.

McKenzie-Jackson has organized climate protests across Europe and South America and has spoken at the Parliament of the United Kingdom, the House of Lords, EU Parliament, outside the G7 Conference and in the Amazonian Rainforest. He gained international recognition after participating in an act of civil-disobedience outside Heathrow Airport against aviation emissions.

Early life and education 
McKenzie-Jackson born in Walthamthow, London, lives with his maternal grandmother, Jean Young, who has also joined McKenzie-Jackson in his environmental activism. McKenzie-Jackson grew up a vegetarian on the grounds of animal welfare, “At 14, I transitioned to veganism, which helped me understand why it can’t just be personal change when fighting the climate crisis”. McKenzie-Jackson was inspired to be an environmental activist when he first heard about climate change in his school, Woodbridge Highschool, through doing research and watching documentaries."I learned a tiny bit about climate change in school. I started watching documentaries, doing my own research, and I got very frustrated. I didn't understand why no politicians were acting" - Elijah McKenzie-Jackson, The Guardian.McKenzie-Jackson took a one year sabbatical from school and is now scheduled to relocate to the New York City to study Fine Art and Sociology starting Fall 2022.

Activism 
McKenzie-Jackson is internationally known for playing a leading role in School Strike for Climate movement. McKenzie-Jackson is a United Nations Togetherband Ambassador for Sustainable Develop Goals 13 & 14. He also is a Youth Advisor for the Resilience Project and Surfers Against Sewage. He served as coordinator at UK Student Climate Network and an organizer at the Stop Trump Coalition.

Europe climate strikes 

McKenzie-Jackson first started climate striking on February 15, 2019 in Parliament Square, London. In April 2019 McKenzie-Jackson protested outside Heathrow Airport in efforts to stop Heathrow Airport's proposed third runway. He went on to hold climate strikes as a part of Greta Thunberg's School strike for climate movement.

On  20 September 2019, alongside UK Student Climate Network, he managed to break England's national record for the biggest environmental protest  with over 100,000 demonstrators in attendance. Elijah is internationally known for playing a leading role in School Strike for Climate movement however beginning in March 2020 due to the rise of the COVID-19 pandemic, McKenzie-Jackson began posting weekly climate strike online.

Voyage to Brazilian Amazon Rainforest 
In November 2019, McKenzie-Jackson went on an expedition into the Amazonian rainforest, where he learned about social and environmental injustice and he met with well known activists such as the Pussy Riots and Chief Raoni to discuss the future safeguarding of the Amazon Rainforest. McKenzie-Jackson especially connected with activist Anita Juruna, an 18-year-old Brazilian indigenous leader.

Hunger strike against West Cumbria coal mine 
McKenzie-Jackson in February 2020, went on hunger strike over the proposed first deep coal mine in 30 years by UK Government in West Cumbria. McKenzie-Jackson coined the phrase, "won’t eat until new coal mine is scrapped". He ended his hunger strike on Day 10 when he was invited into the UK Parliament to speak to politicians about the proposed West Cumbria coal mine. McKenzie-Jackson's 10-day hunger strike triggered actions and protests against the proposed project in Whitehaven. McKenzie-Jackson then, one year later in 2021 started his second 10-day hunger-strike, where he gathered 111,475 petition signatures in collaboration with Coal Action Network in order to appeal Robert Jenrick decision regarding the West Cumbria coal mine. McKenzie-Jackson later handed the petition into the UK Government which later led to the West Cumbria coal mine being successfully called into the UK Parliament for a public review.

Mental health 
McKenzie-Jackson has spoken about his clinically diagnosed depression due to climate grief."With COP26 happening later in the year, I would not say I’m excited about it as it is pretty depressing that young people are essentially forced to organise and lobby for a future. However, I would say I am eager to see real change and action from our so-called leaders. I’d like to see real action, following science, while treating climate change like the crisis it really is.”

COP27 Scrutiny on LGBTQ+ Rights 
In July 2022, McKenzie-Jackson and his partner, Jerome Foster II, co-authored a letter to the UNFCCC to call on the United Nations to move COP27 climate summit due to Egypt's "LGBTQ+ torture, woman slaughter, and civil rights suppression" he says after they started looking into logistics of traveling to Sharm El-Sheikh. As McKenzie-Jackson is an openly-public bisexual figure, him and his parter "might be targeted" according to Guardian News.

The letter, which was directed towards UNFCCC Executive-Secretary, Patricia Espinosa, was sign by prominent activists such as Nadya Tolokonnikova, Ahmed Alaa, and Eric Njuguna.  The couple are calling the UNFCCC non-action a betrayal of the community and “inherent discrimination.”  McKenzie-Jackson emphasized that, “there are better options of countries in Africa that will still include African voices. People shouldn’t be cannon fodder for the climate movement. Cop27 will fail if it’s in Egypt because critical voices will be left out.”

Filmography 

 "Whose Future? OUR FUTURE!" Documentary, 2019
 "Conscientious Protectors: A Story of Rebellion Against Extinction" Documentary, 2022

Bibliography 
 "A Bigger Picture" by Vanessa Nakate; Biography, 2021
 "The Nature of Change" by a coalition of activists; Biography, 2022

References 

People from London
Living people
Youth climate activists
2003 births